Refueling or Refuelling may refer to:
Gas station, for refueling cars
Refueling and Overhaul in the United States Navy 
Reactor refueling
Aerial refueling
Bunkering, the refueling of ships
 Refueling aircraft at airports

See also
 Nuclear reprocessing
 Spent nuclear fuel